James Reid (17 March 1876 – 25 May 1967) was a Scotland international rugby union player, who played as a Full Back.

Rugby Union career

Amateur career

He played for the Edinburgh Academicals.

Provincial career

He played for the Cities District in their match against the Provinces District on 14 January 1899.

Reid played for Edinburgh District. He played in the 1899-1900 Inter-City match against Glasgow District.

International career

Reid played 3 times for Scotland; twice against Ireland, once against England.

References

1876 births
1967 deaths
Scottish rugby union players
Scotland international rugby union players
Edinburgh Academicals rugby union players
Edinburgh District (rugby union) players
Cities District players
Rugby union fullbacks
Rugby union players from Edinburgh